British Dressage is the organisation which oversees all affiliated dressage competitions and training in the United Kingdom. British Dressage is a member of the British Equestrian Federation.

In addition to the usual dressage competitions, British Dressage also oversees the British Young Riders Dressage Squad (BYRDS) and all para-equestrian dressage.

History
Dressage as a competitive sport in the UK was first organised by the British Horse Society in 1961 under the BHS Dressage Group.  In its first year it had 123 members and held eight competitions.

British Dressage as a separate organisation was set up in January 1998, and now has over 18,000 members and organises more than 2,500 days of competition per year.

Governance
The current Chief Executive Officer of British Dressage is Jason Brautigam.  The current president is the Jennie Loriston Clarke, and the current vice-president is Desi Dillingham (President of the British Horse Society). Carl Hester and Lee Pearson are Honorary Patrons of British Dressage.

References

External links
 British Dressage

Equestrian organizations
Animal charities based in the United Kingdom
Organisations based in Warwickshire
1998 establishments in the United Kingdom
Sports organizations established in 1998